Diakité is a Mandinka family name of Fula origin.

In Fula culture, the surname Ba is considered equivalent.

People with this surname
Music
 Abdoulaye Diakité (born 1950), djembe master drummer from Senegal
 Jason Diakité (born 1975), better known as Timbuktu, Swedish musician
 Ramata Diakité (1976–2009), Malian Wassoulou musician

Politics
 Josefina Pitra Diakité, ambassador of Angola to South Africa
 Madubuko Diakité, American human rights lawyer
 Moussa Diakité (192?–1985), Guinean politician during the presidency of Ahmed Sékou Touré
 Yoro Diakité (1932–1973), Malian politician

Sports
 Abdelaye Diakité (born 1990), French footballer
 Adama Diakité (born 1978), Malian footballer in 2002 African Cup of Nations
 Adama Diakité (footballer born 1991), French footballer
 Adama Diakité (footballer born 1993), Ivorian footballer in Italy
 Bafodé Diakité (born 2001), French footballer
 Bakary Diakité (born 1980), German-Malian footballer
 Binta Diakité (born 1988), Ivorian footballer
 Daouda Diakité (born 1983), Burkinabé football goalkeeper
 Drissa Diakité (born 1985), Malian footballer
 Fodé Bangaly Diakité (born 1985), Ivorian footballer
 Ismaël Diakité (born 1991), Mauritanian footballer
 Lamine Diakite (born 1991), Ivorian footballer
 Mamadi Diakite (born 1997), Guinean basketball player
 Mamadou Diakité (footballer) (born 1985), Malian footballer
 Mamadou Diakité (politician) (born 1950), Malian politician
 Mariam Diakité (born 1995), Ivorian footballer
 Modibo Diakité (born 1987), French footballer of Senegalese descent
 Mourtala Diakité (born 1980), Malian footballer
 Nouha Diakité (born 1980), Malian-French basketball player
 Papé Diakité (born 1992), Senegalese footballer
 Ramata Diakité (basketball) (born 1991), Malian basketball player
 Samba Diakité (born 1989), French-Malian footballer
 Soryba Diakité (born 1969), Guinean athlete
 Soumbeïla Diakité (born 1984), Malian footballer

Others
 Sanoussi Diakité, Senegalese mechanical engineer and inventor of the Fonio husking machine
 Youma Diakite (born 1971), Malian model, actress and television personality

Fula surnames